Rollway Lake (also, Murphey Lake, Murphy Lake, and Stony Lake) is a lake located in Beaver Township and Denver Township in Newaygo County, Michigan.  Rollway Lake lies at an elevation of 787 feet (240 m).

See also
List of lakes in Michigan

References

 

Lakes of Michigan
Lakes of Newaygo County, Michigan